

British English spelling
Citigroup Centre, London
Citigroup Centre, Sydney

American English spelling
Citigroup Center, a building in New York City. 
Citigroup Center, Chicago
Citigroup Center, Los Angeles
One Sansome Street, also known as Citigroup Center, in San Francisco

See also
Citicorp Center (disambiguation) 
Citigroup Tower
One Court Square, also known as the Citigroup Building,